The Journal of Transnational Law & Policy is a law review that was established in 1991 as a scholarly forum for discussion of legal developments within the international community. Its articles span a variety of topics within the field of international law, including human rights, comparative law, and U.S. foreign policy.

General information 
The journal is published by students at the Florida State University College of Law, who may earn journal membership by achieving high grades and writing competition scores, along with completing weeks of specialized extracurricular training in legal research and writing. In addition to managing all aspects of publication, journal members also organize an ongoing series of lectures by scholars and authorities in the field, presented annually as the Lillich Lecture Series. The current editor-in-chief is Lyndsey R. Fuller.

Scope 
The journal shares the philosophy articulated by Philip Jessup, judge of the International Court of Justice, who defined "transnational law" as "all law which regulates actions or events that transcend national frontiers." The term "transnational" is thus expansive; it includes both the international and comparative dimensions of law.

External links
 

American law journals
International law journals
Publications established in 1991
Law journals edited by students
English-language journals
Florida State University